William Peter Russell (born 16 January 1935) is an English former professional footballer who played as a centre half.

Career
Born in Gornal, Russell played for Wolverhampton Wanderers, Notts County, Hereford United, Addington and Durban City.

References

1935 births
Living people
People from Sedgley
English footballers
Wolverhampton Wanderers F.C. players
Notts County F.C. players
Hereford United F.C. players
Addington F.C. players
Durban City F.C. players
English Football League players
Association football defenders
English expatriate footballers
English expatriates in South Africa
Expatriate soccer players in South Africa